Prostanthera scutellarioides is a species of flowering plant that is endemic to New South Wales. It is an erect, or low-lying, faintly aromatic shrub with linear leaves and pale to deep mauve flowers arranged in leaf axils.

Description
Flowering mainly occurs from spring to early summer.

Taxonomy
This mintbush was first formally described in 1810 by Robert Brown who gave it the name Chiloides scutellarioides in Prodromus Florae Novae Hollandiae et Insulae Van Diemen. In 1895, John Isaac Briquet changed the name to Prostanthera scutellarioides, publishing the change in Die Natürlichen Pflanzenfamilien.

Distribution and habitat
Prostanthera scutellarioides gows in woodland and forest on the coast and tablelands of New South Wales north from the Windsor district.

References

scutellarioides
Flora of New South Wales
Lamiales of Australia
Plants described in 1810
Taxa named by Robert Brown (botanist, born 1773)